Lyle Krewson (born October 27, 1943) is an American politician who served in the Iowa House of Representatives from 1977 to 1985.

References

1943 births
Living people
Republican Party members of the Iowa House of Representatives